Ingush Autonomous Oblast was an autonomous oblast of the Russian SFSR in the Soviet Union, created on 7 July 1924. Since 16 October 1924 it belonged to North Caucasus Krai. It was merged with the Chechen Autonomous Oblast to form the Chechen-Ingush Autonomous Oblast on 15 January 1934.

References

1924 establishments in the Soviet Union
1934 disestablishments in the Soviet Union
Autonomous oblasts of the Soviet Union
States and territories established in 1924